The opalescent nudibranch or opalescent sea slug may refer to:

Hermissenda opalescens, southwestern North America
Hermissenda crassicornis, northwestern North America

Animal common name disambiguation pages